Marland Oil Company was a major American oil company that manufactured and marketed gasoline, motor oils and other petroleum products. The company was founded in 1917 and by 1920 it was estimated to control 10% of the world's oil production. 

Originally operating in Oklahoma, Marland Oil Co. expanded its operations to Texas, Colorado, California, Mexico, and even Central and South America. In 1929 Marland Oil merged with the Continental Oil Company ("Conoco") by purchasing it, retaining the name "Continental Oil".

History 

The company was founded in 1917, by E. W. Marland, Ponca City, Oklahoma oil exploration pioneer, when he assembled his various holdings including the 101 Ranch Oil Company into one unit. By 1920 it is estimated that Marland and his partners controlled 10% of the world's oil production (the equivalent of Saudi Arabia in 2006) and that Marland was worth $85 million.

On January 3, 1921, Marland incorporated the "Marland Oil Company" in Delaware to acquire through an exchange of stock control of the Marland Refining Corp. and Kay County Gas Co. The company consolidated its growth acquired several small oil companies such as Comar Oil Company, Tom Jones Oil Company, Kenney-Cleary Oil Company, Francoma Oil Company, John S. Alcorn Oil Company, among others.

By 1922 nearly 600 Marland stations were found in 11 mid-continent states, from North Dakota to Oklahoma and as far east as Indiana. Growth required capital, however, and E. W. Marland was continually strapped. Turning to investment banker J.P. Morgan and Company, he was able to secure financial backing for continued expansion, but with expansion came a hefty price. By 1928 he had been forced out by Morgan interests, who placed former Texaco executive Dan Moran in charge.

With orders from Morgan and Company to put Marland Oil back in the black, Moran set out to acquire key assets that would round out the Marland operation, allowing for increased financial stability. With this in mind, Marland management began to look around for a partner, a company with complementary assets, an operation that would perhaps consider a merger.

Talks began with the Continental Oil Company along these lines in late 1928. In the meantime, Marland Oil had acquired Baltimore based Prudential Refining, since a refinery with East Coast marketing access would serve as a processing outlet for Marland's crude oil production. A merger with Continental would facilitate the Baltimore facility to supply Continental's existing Mid-Atlantic marketing efforts, allowing for substantial growth in the number of retail service stations and the increased cash flow related to that increase in sales. On June 26, 1929 the merger was approved, and it acquired for a consideration of 2,317,266 shares of stock, the assets (subject to liabilities) of Continental Oil Company. Although Marland Oil had been the "purchaser", management chose to retain the older and more accepted name, Continental Oil Company. The purchase combined all of the assets of the former Continental Oil, Marland Oil, Prudential Oil and other, lesser known production affiliates of the companies listed. Headquarters for the new company were to be Marland's old Ponca City, Oklahoma offices, with the former Conoco offices in Denver being retained as a district office. The new marketing logo would be a combination of the two previous logos, the Conoco name emblazoned on the crossbar of the famed Marland red triangle. It was an emblem that would remain in use, with minimal change, for the next 40-plus years.

References

External links
 Oklahoma Digital Maps at the OSU (archived, 24 Oct 2012)

Defunct oil companies of the United States
Defunct companies based in Oklahoma
Petroleum in Oklahoma
Energy companies established in 1917
Non-renewable resource companies established in 1917
American companies established in 1917
Non-renewable resource companies disestablished in 1929
Companies formerly listed on the New York Stock Exchange
ConocoPhillips subsidiaries